Shaheed Mohtarma Benazir Bhutto Medical College (or SMBBMC) is a medical school in Lyari, Karachi, Pakistan, that opened in March 2011. The Principal of the college is Dr. Anjum Rehman. The college was opened with financial support from the Government of Pakistan.
Shaheed Mohtarma Benazir Bhutto Medical College part of Lyari General Postgraduate Medical Centre also known as Lyari General Hospital. It also has Institute of Cardiology and is a teaching hospital. It was formerly affiliated with Dow University of Health Sciences.

Departments
Shaheed Mohtarma Benazir Bhutto Medical College has following departments:
 Department of Anatomy 
 Department of Pathology 
 Department of Physiology 
 Department of Biochemistry.
 Department of Forensic Medicine
 Department of pharmacology

See also
 Shaheed Benazir Bhutto City University in Karachi
 Shaheed Benazir Bhutto Dewan University in Karachi
 Shaheed Benazir Bhutto University of Veterinary & Animal Sciences in Sakrand, Sindh
 Benazir Bhutto Shaheed University (Karachi) in Karachi, Sindh
 Shaheed Benazir Bhutto University (Sheringal) in Dir, Khyber Pakhtunkhwa
 Shaheed Benazir Bhutto University (Shaheed Benazirabad) in Shaheed Benazirabad, Sindh
 Shaheed Benazir Bhutto Women University in Peshawar, Khyber Pakhtunkhwa
 Shaheed Mohtarma Benazir Bhutto Medical University in Larkana, Sindh
 Mohtarma Benazir Bhutto Shaheed Medical College

References

4.  http://smbbmcl.edu.pk

Unofficial Group https://m.facebook.com/groups/237832542946739?ref=bookmarks

Universities and colleges in Karachi
Educational institutions established in 2011
Medical colleges in Sindh
Memorials to Benazir Bhutto
2011 establishments in Pakistan